The Terskey Ala-Too is a mountain range in the Tian Shan mountains in Kyrgyzstan. It stretches south and southeast of Lake Issyk-Kul, from the river Joon-Aryk near Kochkor in the west to the far northeastern part of Kyrgyzstan. The length of the range is 354 km and its width is 40 km. Its highest peak is Karakol Peak (5,216 m). Another high peak is Boris Yeltsin Peak (5,168 m).

Geology

Teskey Ala-Too is composed of granites and granodiorites of Caledonian, and granites, metamorphic schists, quartzites, sandstones, and limestones of Paleozoic.

References

External links

Mountain ranges of Kyrgyzstan
Mountain ranges of the Tian Shan